Cordulegaster bilineata, the brown spiketail, is a species of spiketail in the dragonfly family Cordulegastridae. It is found in North America.

The IUCN conservation status of Cordulegaster bilineata is "LC", least concern, with no immediate threat to the species' survival. The population is stable. The IUCN status was reviewed in 2017.

References

Further reading

External links

 

Cordulegastridae
Articles created by Qbugbot
Insects described in 1983